Mebane Holoman Burgwyn (1914–1992) was an award-winning author of children's books. She was born in Rich Square, North Carolina, and graduated from Woman’s College [now The University of North Carolina at Greensboro] in 1935 with a bachelor's degree in primary education. She secured a master's degree in guidance and counseling from East Carolina University in 1961. Burgwyn lived with her family on a farm near Jackson, North Carolina, where she worked as Director of Guidance Services for Northampton County Schools. She was the author of seven books for young people, many of them about the experiences of farm life. She received the American Association of University Women award for the best juvenile book of the year in 1952 for Penny Rose and again in 1970 for The Crackajack Pony. Other books written by Burgwyn are: River Treasure, True Love for Jenny, Hunters’ Hideout, Lucky Michief and Moonflower.
Linda Mebane Holoman Burgwyn, was the daughter of  Henry Dorsey Holoman (1882-1962) and wife Pattie Vaughn White
Her father and grandfather owned a stately home on the Braswell Rd. near Rich Square/Jackson Rd. the Holoman Family Graveyard is on the property enclosed by an iron fence. She is the Grandchild of George D Holoman (1828-1890) & Mary Boyce. The Holoman, Boyce, and Burgwyns are early names associated with Northampton County NC.

References
Finding Aid for the Mebane Holoman Burgwyn at The University of North Carolina at Greensboro

External links

1914 births
1992 deaths
People from Rich Square, North Carolina
East Carolina University alumni
American children's writers
Writers from North Carolina
American women children's writers
20th-century American women writers